Gliese 682 or GJ 682 is a red dwarf. It is listed as the 53rd-nearest known star system to the Sun, being 16.3 light years away from the Earth. Even though it is close by, it is dim with a magnitude of 10.95 and thus requires a telescope to be seen.  It is located in the constellation of Scorpius, near the bright star Theta Scorpii.
The star is in a crowded region of sky near the Galactic Center, and so appears to be near a number of deep-sky objects from the Solar System's perspective. The star is only 0.5 degrees from the much more distant globular cluster NGC 6388.

Search for planets

Two candidate planets were detected orbiting Gliese 682 in 2014, one of which would be in the habitable zone. However, a 2020 study did not find these planets and concluded that the radial velocity signals were probably caused by stellar activity.

See also
List of nearest stars

References

0682
M-type main-sequence stars
Scorpius (constellation)
086214
CD-44 11909
TIC objects